The North Jutland Artillery Regiment was an artillery regiment of the Royal Danish Army. On 1 November 2000 it was merged with Southern Jutland Artillery Regiment to form Queen's Artillery Regiment.

The regiment was established in 1923 as 3. Feltartilleriregiment. In 1969 the regiment moved from Århus to new build barracks in Skive. Jutlandic Air Defence Regiment was merged with the regiment on 1 November 1974.

Units
 
  3rd Armoured Artillery Battalion (1961-2000), part of 1st Jutland Brigade
  6th Armoured Artillery Battalion (1974-1996), part of 2nd Jutland Brigade 
  8th Light Artillery Battalion (1983-2000), part of Jutland Battle Group
  9th Light Artillery Battalion (1961-1985) -  9th Light Battery(1985-2000), part of Military region II 
  14th Anti Air Artillery Battalion (1974-1982) part of Jutland Division Artillery, Transferred to Southern Jutland Artillery Regiment
  15th Light Artillery Battalion (1961-1985) -  15th Light Battery(1985-2000), part of Military region I 
  16th Light Artillery Battalion (1990-1996), Transferred from King's Artillery Regiment, part of 4th  Battle Group
  18th Heavy Artillery Battery (1961-1996) - 18th MLRS Battery (1997-2000), part of Jutlands Division Artillery
  19th Heavy Artillery Battery (1961-1996), part of Jutland Division Artillery
  23rd Artillery Battalion (1961-2000) part of Jutland Division Artillery
  33rd Heavy Artillery Battalion (1961-1996) - part of LANDJUT/Corps Artillery
  Staff and Target Acquisition Battery/JDIV(1961-1982) part of Jutland Division Artillery, Transferred to Southern Jutland Artillery Regiment
  2nd Staff Company/2nd Jutland Brigade. (1976-1996)

Names of the regiment

References
 Lærebog for Hærens Menige, Hærkommandoen, marts 1960

Artillery regiments of Denmark
Military units and formations established in 1923
1923 establishments in Denmark